Bernhard Hiesinger (born 27 April 1947) is a German rower who represented West Germany. He competed at the 1968 Summer Olympics in Mexico City with the men's coxless pair where they came twelfth.

References

1947 births
Living people
German male rowers
Olympic rowers of West Germany
Rowers at the 1968 Summer Olympics
People from Albstadt
Sportspeople from Tübingen (region)